The Japanese Empire issued its first postage stamps in April 1871. In 1896 the first persons to be depicted on a stamp were Prince Kitashirakawa Yoshihisa (1847–1895) and Prince Arisugawa Taruhito (1835–1895) in honor of their role in the First Sino-Japanese War that ended one year earlier. The first woman and third person depicted on a Japanese postage stamp was in 1908 and 1914 Empress Jingū, a legendary Japanese empress who ruled following her husband's death in 200 AD. She was in 1881 already the first woman depicted on a Japanese bank note. However no actual picture of her exists. Instead an artistical representation by Edoardo Chiossone was used for the bank note, modelled after a female employee of the Government Printing Bureau which lead to a western appearance. For the postage stamps of 1908 and 1914 the same image was used. However the printing plates were destroyed in the 1923 Great Kantō earthquake and a revised design by Yoshida Toyo was used for stamps issued in 1924 with a more asian appearance. A definitive series in 1942 reflected Japan's entry into World War II, with designs including war workers and saluting aviators.

After World War II the first person depicted on a stamp was in 1946 as part of a definitive series Baron Maejima Hisoka (1835–1919), the founder of the Japanese postal service. From 1949 to 1952 a series of eighteen "Personalities of the Cultural History" was issued. In 2006 a series of 20 stamps of Japanese movies was issued depicting famous movie characters.

List 
This following table lists people who have been featured on Japanese postage stamps before 2007 in alphabetic order of their last name. The list can also be sorted by year.

Notes

Literature 
 Michel catalogue Japan, Korea, Mongolei, Georgien, GUS in Asien 2020, Übersee Band 9.2, 42nd edition, ISBN 978-3-95402-310-3, p. 223–677 (German)

References

External links 

 Famous people on stamps of Japan by year, colnect.com
 Women on stamps of Japan by year, colnect.com

Japan, List of people on stamps of
Stamps
Postage stamps of Japan
People on stamps